The 2005 European Weightlifting Championships were held in Sofia, Bulgaria from April 19 to April 24, 2005. It was the 84th edition of the event. There were a total number of 185 athletes competing, from 30 nations.

Medal overview

Men

Women

Medal table

References
Results (sports123)

 
European
Weightlifting
Weightlifting
European Weightlifting Championships